Dakota Ray Hebert is a Dene comedian, actress and writer from Canada. She is most noted for her performance in the 2021 film Run Woman Run, for which she won the awards for Best Actress at the 2021 American Indian Film Festival and Best Performance at the 2022 Vancouver International Women in Film Festival.

Originally from Meadow Lake, Saskatchewan, Hebert first became known as a stage actress, including in productions of Tara Beagan's Dreary and Izzy, Falen Johnson's Salt Baby and Ellie Moon's This Was the World. In 2019, she both wrote and starred in the play Native Studies 101 for the Gordon Tootoosis Nikaniwin Theatre in Saskatoon.

In 2022 she released her debut comedy album I'll Give You an Indian Act, performed at the Toronto edition of Just for Laughs, and appeared in an episode of Comedy Night with Rick Mercer.

She has been announced as part of the cast of the forthcoming CTV sitcom Shelved.

References

External links

21st-century Canadian actresses
21st-century Canadian dramatists and playwrights
21st-century Canadian women writers
21st-century Canadian comedians
21st-century First Nations writers
Canadian film actresses
Canadian television actresses
Canadian stage actresses
Canadian women dramatists and playwrights
Canadian stand-up comedians
Canadian women comedians
Dene people
First Nations actresses
First Nations dramatists and playwrights
First Nations comedians
Actresses from Saskatchewan
Comedians from Saskatchewan
Writers from Saskatchewan
People from Meadow Lake, Saskatchewan
Living people
Year of birth missing (living people)